Kasit Piromya (born 15 December 1944 in Thonburi) is a Thai diplomat, Democrat Party politician, and former People's Alliance for Democracy ("Yellow Shirts") activist. He was Foreign Minister of Thailand under Abhisit Vejjajiva from 2008 to 2011.

Early life and education
Kasit was born on 15 December 1944 at Thonburi. He received early education at Bangkok Christian College and then went to study at the high school level at St Joseph's College, Darjeeling. After that, he returned to higher education at the Faculty of Political Science, Chulalongkorn University. He admitted to Chulalongkorn University for a period of time and applied for a bachelor's degree in International Affairs at the School of Foreign Service, Georgetown University, USA. After that, Kasit received an international relations study at the Institute of Social Studies, the Netherlands and the National Defense College, Class 32.

Careers
He has served as the ambassador to the Soviet Union and Mongolia, Russia and the former Soviet republics, Indonesia and Papua New Guinea, Germany, Japan, and the United States. Most recently he has appeared on government opposition channels to denounce the current government as well as to denounce the US for interfering in Thai affairs.

Royal decorations 
Kasit has received the following royal decorations in the Honours System of Thailand:

  Knight Grand Cordon (Special Class) of the Most Exalted Order of the White Elephant

  Knight Grand Cordon (Special Class) of The Most Noble Order of the Crown of Thailand

References

External links

Kasit Piromya
Kasit Piromya
Kasit Piromya
Kasit Piromya
Kasit Piromya
Living people
Kasit Piromya
Kasit Piromya
Kasit Piromya
Kasit Piromya
Kasit Piromya
Kasit Piromya
Kasit Piromya
1944 births
Grand Crosses with Star and Sash of the Order of Merit of the Federal Republic of Germany
Kasit Piromya